Manvel is a city in Brazoria County, Texas, United States. As of the 2020 census the population was 9,992, up from 5,179 at the 2010 census.

History 
The population increased from 5,179 to 9,992 from 2010 to 2020, and in November 2021 there were 12,000 lots in twelve housing complexes that were to be developed.

Geography 

Manvel is located in northern Brazoria County at  (29.479200, –95.356299). Iowa Colony is to the west, Pearland is to the north, and Alvin is to the east.

Subdivisions within the City of Manvel consist of Rodeo Palms, Lakeland, Pomona, Meridianna, Del Bello Lakes, Blue Water Estates, Terra Estates, Yanni Palms, Fox Tail, Sedona Lakes.

Demographics 

As of the 2020 United States census, there were 9,992 people, 3,881 households, and 2,954 families residing in the city.

As of the census of 2000, Manvel had a population of 3,046, 1,085 households, and 870 families in the city. The population density was 130.7 people per square mile (50.5/km). There were 1,148 housing units at an average density of 49.3 per square mile (19.0/km). The racial makeup of the city was 65.7% White, 13.9% African American, 0.6% Native American, 8.6% Asian, 8.9% from other races, and 2.3% from two or more races. Hispanic or Latino of any race were 15.6% of the population.

Of the 1,085 households, 36.4% had children under the age of 18 living with them, 67.9% were married couples living together, 7.6% had a female householder with no husband present, and 19.8% were non-families.  15.5% of households were one person and 4.4% were one person aged 65 or older.  The average household size was 2.80 and the average family size was 3.13.

The age distribution was 25.8% under the age of 18, 7.1% from 18 to 24, 29.9% from 25 to 44, 28.7% from 45 to 64, and 8.5% 65 or older.  The median age was 38 years.  For every 100 females, there were 100.7 males. For every 100 females age 18 and over, there were 111.3 males.

The median household income was $65,862 and the median family income was $79,217.  Males had a median income of $45,602 versus $28,083 for females. The per capita income for the city was $23,751.  About 1.3% of families and 3.0% of the population were below the poverty line, including 2.6% of those under age 18 and 1.9% of those age 65 or over.

Government
Brazoria County operates the Manvel Substation in Manvel.

The city government is governed by an elected body consisting of one Mayor and six Council-members. All seven of the elected individuals have a vote based on the rules of the city drafted in its charter. The City transitioned in 2011 from a General Law city to a Home Rule City. This led to the establishment of the City Charter, City Master Plans, and the current governance structure. The City of Manvel takes a strong City manager form of government which is different from the City of Houston which is a strong Mayor form of government.

City Council meetings are held on the first and third Monday of every month and the Planning, Development, and Zoning Board meetings are held on the second and fourth meeting of every month. Other boards, commissions, and task-forces meet at various other dates throughout the month.

The City of Manvel has a current yearly general fund budget nearing $10 million, over 60 full-time employees, and the biggest department in the city being the Manvel Police Department. The current tax rate is .61 cents per $100 of valuation and there are more than 15 capital improvement projects being planned for.

Education

Primary and secondary schools

Public schools 
Students in Manvel attend schools in the Alvin Independent School District.

Elementary schools in Manvel and serving Manvel include:
 E.C. Mason Elementary School
 Don Jeter Elementary School
 Meridiana Elementary School in Iowa Colony
 Hood-Case Elementary School in Alvin

The following junior high schools serve Manvel: Manvel Junior High School, Rodeo Palms Junior High School, Caffey Junior High School, and Harby Junior High School (a small portion). Most areas north of Texas State Highway 6 are zoned to Manvel High School in Manvel while areas south of Highway 6 are zoned to Iowa Colony High School in Iowa Colony.

Manvel was served by Alvin High School (in the nearby city of Alvin), until 2006, when Manvel High opened. After Manvel High opened, the entire city was in the Manvel High zone. Beginning in 2016 Shadow Creek High School in Shadow Creek Ranch, Pearland served a portion of Manvel, but as of 2022 this is no longer the case.

With the passage of a local bond, several new schools, including an additional high school located in the neighboring city of Iowa Colony, will be constructed in coming years.

Colleges and universities 
Manvel is served by the Alvin Community College system, with limited evening and weekend courses being offered at Manvel High School during the Fall and Spring terms. Manvel is in the ACC taxation zone.

Manvel is also within  to several larger colleges including the University of Houston, Rice University, Texas A&M Galveston, University of St. Thomas, Houston Community College, Texas Southern University, Baylor College of Medicine, University of Texas at Houston School of Medicine, University of Texas Medical Branch and Houston Baptist University.

Public libraries 
The Manvel Library at 20514B Highway 6 is a part of the Brazoria County Library System.

Transportation and Infrastructure 
Texas State Highway 288, a four-lane freeway, runs through the northwest part of Manvel, leading north  to downtown Houston and south  to Angleton, the Brazoria County seat.

Manvel has no mapped railways running through it or within it.

Air travel in Manvel is convenient to access. General aviation can be utilized at the nearby Houston Southwest Airport along state highway 6, and Houston Hobby International Airport is rather close to the city, with a driving distance of about 17 miles on the quickest route. The larger but farther George Bush Intercontinental Airport is also accessible by utilizing state highway 288 and Interstate 69, and driving distance on such route is around 43 miles from the center of Manvel.

Notable people 

 Austin Bennett, former University of Oklahoma wide receiver
 D'Eriq King, University of Houston then Miami University quarterback
 Koda Martin, Arizona Cardinals offensive lineman
 D'Vaughn Pennamon, Ole Miss tight end
 Jalen Preston, Texas A&M wide receiver
 Kyle Trask, Tampa Bay Buccaneers quarterback. Trask was picked with the 64th pick in the 2021 NFL Draft
 Brianna Turner, Phoenix Mercury forward

References

External links

 City of Manvel official website
 Alvin-Manvel Area Chamber of Commerce
 Manvel Police Department
 Manvel Economic Development
 Manvel Volunteer Fire Department
 Manvel Emergency Medical Services
 

Cities in Texas
Greater Houston
Cities in Brazoria County, Texas